Beacon Park (Plymouth) is the site of a former rugby union stadium on the north side of the Beacon Park Road in north Plymouth; redeveloped into housing called Albion Drive.

Rugby Union

When Devonport Albion merged with Plymouth RFC to become Plymouth Albion R.F.C. they moved into Beacon Park in 1920.

Greyhound racing
Greyhound racing started on the 5 May 1928 with racing over 525 yards behind a trackless hare. The greyhound racing was independent (unaffiliated to a governing body) and whippet racing was also prominent. New management took over during September 1929 and racing sometimes took place twice on one day at 3pm & 5pm. Racing came to an end on 4 July 1931.

Closure
Plymouth moved out in 2003 and the stadium was sold and redeveloped into a housing estate called Barlow Gardens.

The nearby Albion Drive occupies the site of the former Beacon Park reservoir, which was demolished and built on around 2001.

References

Defunct greyhound racing venues in the United Kingdom
Defunct rugby union venues in England
Sports venues in Plymouth, Devon